Katja Poulsen (born 10 December 1976) is a Danish archer. She competed in the women's individual event at the 2000 Summer Olympics.

References

1976 births
Living people
Danish female archers
Olympic archers of Denmark
Archers at the 2000 Summer Olympics
Place of birth missing (living people)